Gobio meridionalis is a species of gudgeon, a small freshwater in the family Cyprinidae. It is found in the middle reaches of the Yellow River in China.

References

 

Gobio
Fish described in 1987
Freshwater fish of China